Dagong Global Credit Rating is a state-owned credit rating agency based in China.

History

The company was established in 1994, following approval by the People's Bank of China and the State Economic and Trade Division of the People's Republic of China.

In May 2009, an agreement of mutual cooperation was signed with Xinhua News Agency, reported as "promoting a national credit rating system". The company stated that it has used "dialectical materialism" as part of its evaluative approach.

In June 2013, Dagong Europe Credit Rating was registered and received authorisation from the European Securities and Markets Authority as Credit Rating Agency. In the same year, it was recognised by the Joint Committee of the three European Supervisory Authorities  (EBA, ESMA and EIOPA) as External Credit Assessment Institution operating in the European Union. It was led by Mauro Alfonso until February 2014.

In 2018, Dagong's operations were suspended following accusations of corruption and doctored ratings in exchange for fees. In 2019, Dagong was nationalized.

See also
List of countries by credit rating
Dagong Europe Credit Rating

References

External links 

 

1994 establishments in China
Credit rating agencies
Government-owned companies of China